Zaltbommel is a railway station located in Zaltbommel, Netherlands. The station was opened on 1 November 1869 and is located on the Utrecht–Boxtel railway. The train services are operated by Nederlandse Spoorwegen.

Train services

Bus services

Railway stations in Gelderland
Railway stations opened in 1869
1869 establishments in the Netherlands
Zaltbommel
Railway stations in the Netherlands opened in the 19th century